Anna Karenina is a 1977 BBC television adaptation of Leo Tolstoy's 1877 novel of the same name.

It stars Nicola Pagett as Anna, Eric Porter as Karenin, and Stuart Wilson as Vronsky.

It consisted of ten 50-minute episodes, and so was able to include more of the original plot than some adaptations. It was mostly favourably received by critics.

External links 

1977 British television series endings
Adaptations of works by Leo Tolstoy
1977 British television series debuts
Television shows set in Russia
Television series set in the 1870s